Śrīdhara, Śrīdharācāryya or Śrīdhara Acharya ( 870 CE –  930 CE) was an Indian mathematician, Sanskrit pandit and philosopher. He was born in Bhuriśreṣṭi (Bhurisriṣṭi or Bhurśuṭ) village in South Rādha at present day Hugli in West Bengal, then undivided Bengal with its Capital at Gaur. His father's name was Baladevācārya or Baladeva Acharya and his mother's name was Acchoka Devi. His father was a Sanskrit pandit and philosopher.

Notable books 
He is known for two main treatises: Trisatika (300) (sometimes called the Patiganitasara ) and the Pāṭīgaṇita. It was written in three hundred ślokas thus his major work Pāṭīgaṇitasāra was named Triśatika. The book discusses counting of numbers, natural number, zero, measures, multiplication, fraction, division,  squares, cubes,  rule of three, interest-calculation, joint business or partnership, and mensuration (the main part of geometry concerned with ascertaining sizes, lengths, areas, and volumes). Three other works have been attributed to him, namely the Bījaganita, Navasatī, and Bṛhatpati.

Notable work 
The below are some of his notable works:
 He gave an exposition on the zero. He wrote, "If zero is added to any number, the sum is the same number; if zero is subtracted from any number, the number remains unchanged; if zero is multiplied by any number, the product is zero".
 In the case of dividing a fraction he has found out the method of multiplying the fraction by the reciprocal of the divisor.
 He wrote on the practical applications of algebra.
 He separated algebra from arithmetic.
 He was the first person to give an algorithm for solving quadratic equations (although there is no indication that he considered two solutions).
 Sridharacharya's formula is also known as the Quadratic formula or Sridharacharya's method. Sridharacharya Method is used to find solutions to quadratic equations of the general form ax² + bx + c = 0, a ≠ 0 and is given by

References

Bibliography 
 
 The Date of Sridharacharya by S. Srikanta Sastri, The Jaina Antiquary (Jan, 1948)

870s births
930 deaths
9th-century Indian mathematicians
9th-century Indian philosophers
10th-century Indian mathematicians
10th-century Indian philosophers
Indian logicians
Scholars from West Bengal
Bengali mathematicians
Bengali philosophers